"No Earthly Connection" is a song written and recorded by Belgian acid house musician Praga Khan. It was featured on Freakazoids.

Track listing
 "No Earthly Connection (Radio Edit)" - 3:37	
 "No Earthly Connection (Album Version)" - 6:47

References

2002 singles
2002 songs
Praga Khan songs